Willie Miller (20 October 1924 – 23 June 2005) was a Scottish footballer, who played as a goalkeeper for Celtic, Clyde and Hibernian. Miller was capped six times by the Scotland national football team.

Miller was signed by Celtic in May 1942, and made his debut in the following August, aged just 17. He remained at Celtic Park until 1950, but he won no medals. On the resumption of international football after the Second World War, Miller was first choice for Scotland. He also represented the Scottish League XI seven times between March 1947 and November 1948.

In 1950 he moved across the city to Clyde, and had two good seasons before being dropped from the team. Miller left Clyde in November 1953, and after a few months out of football, signed for Hibernian. He was used as reserve cover, however, and only made three league appearances before retiring from the game in 1955.

References

External links 

London Hearts profile

1924 births
2005 deaths
Sportspeople from Larkhall
Association football goalkeepers
Scottish footballers
Scotland international footballers
Scottish Football League players
Maryhill Harp F.C. players
Celtic F.C. players
Clyde F.C. players
Hibernian F.C. players
Scottish Football League representative players
Scottish Junior Football Association players
Footballers from South Lanarkshire
Scotland wartime international footballers
Place of death missing